The qualification for the 2020 women's Olympic volleyball tournament allocated twelve teams quota spots: the host, the winners of each of six Intercontinental Qualifying Tournaments, and five continental Olympic qualification tournament champions. Teams already qualified for the event were not eligible to play in the following qualification tournaments.

Qualification summary

Timeline

Pool standing procedure

For all qualification tournaments except North American qualification tournament

 Total number of victories (matches won, matches lost)
 In the event of a tie, the following first tiebreaker will apply: The teams will be ranked by the most point gained per match as follows:
Match won 3–0 or 3–1: 3 points for the winner, 0 points for the loser
Match won 3–2: 2 points for the winner, 1 point for the loser
Match forfeited: 3 points for the winner, 0 points (0–25, 0–25, 0–25) for the loser
 If teams are still tied after examining the number of victories and points gained, then the FIVB will examine the results in order to break the tie in the following order:
Set quotient: if two or more teams are tied on the number of points gained, they will be ranked by the quotient resulting from the division of the number of all set won by the number of all sets lost.
Points quotient: if the tie persists based on the set quotient, the teams will be ranked by the quotient resulting from the division of all points scored by the total of points lost during all sets.
If the tie persists based on the point quotient, the tie will be broken based on the team that won the match of the Round Robin Phase between the tied teams. When the tie in point quotient is between three or more teams, these teams ranked taking into consideration only the matches involving the teams in question.

For North American qualification tournament only

 Number of matches won
 Match points
 Points ratio
 Sets ratio
 Result of the last match between the tied teams

Match won 3–0: 5 match points for the winner, 0 match points for the loser
Match won 3–1: 4 match points for the winner, 1 match point for the loser
Match won 3–2: 3 match points for the winner, 2 match points for the loser

Host country
FIVB reserved a vacancy for the 2020 Olympic Games host country to participate in the tournament.

Intercontinental Olympic Qualification Tournaments

The winners in each pool will qualify for the 2020 Olympic Games.

Qualification round 
Twenty-four teams qualified for the competition as the top twenty-four teams of FIVB World Rankings on 1 January 2019 (except Japan who qualified as host.).

Qualified teams

Final round

Means of qualification

Pool A

Pool B

Pool C

Pool D

Pool E

Pool F

Continental Olympic Qualification Tournaments

Africa

Of the 5 entered teams, only winner of this round was qualified to the 2020 Olympics.

Means of qualification

Round robin

Asia and Oceania
The winners in final round will qualify for the 2020 Olympic Games.

Qualified teams
Of the 61 AVC and IOC member associations, a total of 13 AVC member national teams entered the qualifying stage

Qualification round

Final round

Notes
Teams in bold qualified for the next phase and final tournament.
(H): Qualification group hosts

Qualification round

Of the 13 qualified teams, top eight teams (excluding Japan, and 2019 IOQT pool B winners China) will be qualified to the next round.

Means of qualification

Pool A

Pool B

Pool C

Pool D

Pool G

Pool H

9th–12th Classification round

Final round

Of the 8 qualified teams, only winner of this round will be qualified to the 2020 Olympics.

Means of qualification

Pool A

Pool B

Final four

Europe
The winners in final round will qualify for the 2020 Olympic Games.

Qualification round
Eight teams qualified for the competition as the top eight teams of CEV European Rankings on 1 October 2019 (except Serbia , Russia and Italy who qualified as Intercontinental Qualifier winners).

Final round

Of the 8 qualified teams, only winner of this round will be qualified to the 2020 Olympics.

Means of qualification

Pool A

Pool B

Final four

North America
The winners in final round will qualify for the 2020 Summer Olympics.

Qualified teams
Of the 35 NORCECA and IOC member associations, a total of 8 NORCECA member national teams entered the qualifying stage.

Qualification round – NORCECA Champions Cup

Qualification round – NORCECA Championship

Final round

Notes
Teams in bold qualified for the next phase and final tournament.
(H): Qualification group hosts

Qualification round

The 2019 NORCECA Champions Cup champions and the top three teams from the 2019 NORCECA Championship which had not yet qualified to the 2020 Summer Olympics will compete in the North American Olympic Qualification Tournament.

Means of qualification

NORCECA Champions Cup – Round robin

Source: NORCECA
(H) Host; (Q) Qualified to the phase indicated.

NORCECA Championship – Pool A

Source: NORCECA
(H) Host; (Q) Qualified to the phase indicated.

NORCECA Championship – Pool B

Source: NORCECA

NORCECA Championship – Final round

Final round

Of the 4 qualified teams, only winner of this round will be qualified to the 2020 Olympics.

Means of qualification

Round robin

Source: FIVB
(H) Host.
(Q) Qualified to the phase indicated.

South America
The winners in final round will qualify for the 2020 Olympic Games.

Qualified teams
Of the 11 CSV and IOC member associations, a total of 8 CSV member national teams entered the qualifying stage

Qualification round

Final round

Notes
Teams in bold qualified for the next phase and final tournament.
(H): Qualification group hosts

Qualification round

The top four teams from the 2019 South American Championship which had not yet qualified to the 2020 Olympic Games will compete in the South American Olympic Qualification Tournament.

Means of qualification

Pool A

Pool B

5th–8th Classification round

Final round

Of the 4 qualified teams, only winner of this round will be qualified to the 2020 Olympics.

Means of qualification

Round robin

References

Women
Qualification for the 2020 Summer Olympics
2020
2020 in women's volleyball